Mount Vaught is located in the Livingston Range, Glacier National Park in the U.S. state of Montana. Mount Vaught is just over  SSW of Heavens Peak. The mountain is named for Lawrence O. Vaught, a lawyer from Jacksonville, Illinois, who spent many of his summers in Glacier Park and corresponded with George Bird Grinnell, who named many of the features in the park.

Climate
Based on the Köppen climate classification, the peak is located in an alpine subarctic climate zone with long, cold, snowy winters, and cool to warm summers. Temperatures can drop below −10 °F with wind chill factors below −30 °F.

See also
 List of mountains and mountain ranges of Glacier National Park (U.S.)

References

External links
 National Park Service web site: Glacier National Park
 Mount Vaught weather: Mountain Forecast

Livingston Range
Mountains of Flathead County, Montana
Mountains of Glacier National Park (U.S.)
Mountains of Montana